The 1950 Macdonald Brier, the Canadian men's national curling championship, was held from March 6 to 10, 1950 at Kerrisdale Arena in Vancouver, British Columbia. A total of 25,000 fans attended the event.

Team Northern Ontario, who was skipped by Tom Ramsay won the Brier Tankard with a round robin record of 7-2. This was Northern Ontario's first Brier championship.

Alberta, Manitoba, and Ontario all tied for second with 6-3 records, necessitating a tiebreaker playoff between the three teams for runner-up. Manitoba would ultimately be the runner-up as they defeated Ontario 13-8 in the second tiebreaker game. Ontario defeated Alberta 7-5 in the first tiebreaker game.

Event Summary
Heading into the final day of the Brier, Northern Ontario and Ontario were the front runners to win the Brier with 5-1 records. Alberta and Quebec one game behind at 4-2 while British Columbia, Manitoba, and Nova Scotia still in the mix at 3-3.

In the Thursday morning session, Northern Ontario defeated British Columbia 6-5, thus eliminating all the three loss teams from Brier championship contention. Manitoba stomped Alberta 15-6, also eliminating Alberta from championship contention while Quebec beat Ontario 13-8. This left Northern Ontario, Ontario, and Quebec in contention for the championship.

Northern Ontario would clinch the Brier Tankard in the afternoon session on Thursday with a 14-1 victory over Nova Scotia. In the remaining Thursday afternoon games, BC would defeat Quebec 8-7, Alberta defeated Ontario 11-7, and Manitoba beat Prince Edward Island 16-9. Even though the championship was already decided, this did not mean that this edition of the Brier would end anticlimactically in the Thursday evening session as there was a possibility of a five-way playoff for second place between Alberta, BC, Manitoba, Nova Scotia, Ontario, and Quebec.

In the final round robin session on Thursday evening, Alberta would beat Nova Scotia 11-10 clinching them at least a spot in the playoff and eliminating BC in the process. Quebec's 16-2 loss to Saskatchewan meant that Quebec was no longer a possibility for the playoff. With Ontario demolishing New Brunswick 20-4 and Manitoba edging Brier champion Northern Ontario 8-7, this meant that Alberta, Manitoba, and Ontario would decide who would finish runner-up. The first tiebreaker would be played late Thursday night into Friday morning while the second tiebreaker would be played Friday morning.

In the second place tiebreaker playoff, Manitoba would draw the bye meaning that Alberta and Ontario would play in the first tiebreaker with the winning facing Manitoba in the second tiebreaker. In the first tiebreaker, Alberta held a 5-2 lead after eight ends, but Ontario would score five in the next four ends to win 7-5. In the second tiebreaker, Manitoba would score four in the first end. Ontario would come back to tie the game at 5 after the fifth end, but Manitoba would score four in the sixth and never look back as they took runner-up over Ontario 13-8.

Teams
The teams are listed as follows:

Round-robin standings

Round-robin results
All draw times are listed in Pacific Time (UTC−08:00)

Draw 1
Monday, March 6 3:00 PM

Draw 2
Monday, March 6 8:00 PM

Draw 3
Tuesday, March 7 9:30 AM

Draw 4
Tuesday, March 7 2:30 PM

Draw 5
Wednesday, March 8 3:00 PM

Draw 6
Wednesday, March 8 3:00 PM

Draw 7
Thursday, March 9 9:30 AM

Draw 8
Thursday, March 9 2:30 PM

Draw 9
Thursday, March 9 7:30 PM

Playoff

Tiebreaker #1
Thursday, March 9

Tiebreaker #2
Friday, March 10

References 

Macdonald Brier, 1950
Macdonald Brier, 1950
The Brier
Sports competitions in Vancouver
Curling in British Columbia
Macdonald Brier
Macdonald Brier
1950s in Vancouver